Mont-Saint-Martin is a commune in the Meurthe-et-Moselle department in north-eastern France. It is part of the urban area of Longwy.

Population

See also
Communes of the Meurthe-et-Moselle department

References

Montsaintmartin
Duchy of Bar